Thomas Ezequiel Habif (born 27 May 1996) is an Argentine field hockey player who plays as a midfielder for German Bundesliga club Harvestehuder THC and the Argentine national team.

His sisters Florencia and Agustina have also respresented Argentina in hockey.

Club career
Habif played for GEBA in Argentina until the 2020 Summer Olympics. After the Olympics he joined Bundesliga club Harvestehuder THC in Hamburg.

International career
He competed in the 2020 Summer Olympics. He made his World Cup debut at the 2023 Men's FIH Hockey World Cup.

References

External links

1996 births
Living people
Field hockey players from Buenos Aires
Male field hockey midfielders
Field hockey players at the 2020 Summer Olympics
Argentine male field hockey players
Olympic field hockey players of Argentina
Harvestehuder THC players
Men's Feldhockey Bundesliga players
Competitors at the 2022 South American Games
South American Games gold medalists for Argentina
South American Games medalists in field hockey
2023 Men's FIH Hockey World Cup players
21st-century Argentine people